Perry Hall High School (PHHS) is a public high school in Baltimore County,  Maryland, United States, established in 2004 enrolling about 2,000 students a year. Located in the northeastern Baltimore suburb of Perry Hall and serving the surrounding communities, such as Kingsville and Glen Arm, it is part of the Baltimore County Public Schools system. Area middle schools that feed into Perry Hall High are Perry Hall Middle School and Pine Grove Middle School.

Structure 
When initially established, Perry Hall High School was located in the building which today is Perry Hall Middle School. The class of 1968 was the first class to graduate from the new and current building located just down the road. In 1973 construction started on a small addition to the front of the building. This first addition was built adjacent to the library. Nine new classrooms were built to accommodate 350 more students and four new teachers.  Renovations that took place in the same year included a team locker room, new biology, and chemistry labs, and an addition to the faculty dining room.  A three-story new addition had to be built in 1997 to fight overcrowding. The new section has health and career education classrooms below ground level, tall music rooms and social science rooms at ground level, and foreign language and art rooms on the second floor.  Because of the tall music rooms, the second floor of the new addition is a half story higher than the second floor of the main building. Currently, there are portable classrooms situated outside the main building to alleviate the continuing overpopulation problem. The most recent addition was a hallway around the auditorium to alleviate the crowded junction on the first floor between the old and new wings.

History 

Perry Hall High School was established in 1963 in the middle of a growing community. The doors opened on September 6 to sophomores and juniors, taking students that would have otherwise attended Parkville High School or Overlea High School. The first principal of Perry Hall High School was Maynard E. Keadle. Perry Hall High School's first graduates were members of the class of 1965. Within five years, a second building was constructed to accommodate the high number of students in the area. The new building opened in the fall of 1967 to Perry Hall High School students while the original building became Perry Hall Junior High School, known as Perry Hall Middle School today.

In 1987, the movie Hairspray was filmed at Perry Hall High School.

Overcrowding

A new addition replaced portable classrooms at Perry Hall High School in 1997, but by 2003 portable classrooms were needed once again.  In 2005, a new hallway was built to try to ease the overcrowded hallways. With Perry Hall High School being the most populated school in the Baltimore County public school system, the Perry Hall Improvement Association has started a petition to gather support for a new high school to be constructed in northeast Baltimore County.

2012 shooting
A shooting occurred at the Perry Hall cafeteria on the first day of school at 10:45 a.m., Monday, August 27, 2012. The shooter, 15-year-old sophomore student Robert Gladden, Jr., attended the first two classes and then went to the school restroom during break time, where he allegedly reassembled a 16 gauge shotgun from his backpack and loaded it. He exited the restroom with the shotgun hidden under his clothing and pulled it out in the cafeteria, where he fired a shot that struck a 17-year-old male student in the back, critically wounding him. A school guidance counselor, Jesse Wasmer, and Richard Rosenthal, a mathematics teacher, immediately rushed to Gladden and attempted to subdue him. More faculty members rushed the shooter, who fired into the ceiling during the struggle. Several people suffered minor cuts and bruises during the panic that ensued. Students were evacuated to a nearby shopping center and middle school.

In February 2013, Gladden was sentenced to 35 years in prison on charges of attempted murder.

Academics
Perry Hall High school received a 54.7 out of a possible 100 points (54%) on the 2018-2019 Maryland State Department of Education Report Card and received a 3 out of 5 star rating, ranking in the 35th percentile among all Maryland schools.

Students
The 2019–2020 enrollment at Perry Hall High School was 1969 students.

Extracurricular activities 
There are many clubs and activities in the arts, languages, music, career interests, and recreation from which students may choose:

Academic
It's Academic
Science Club
Mock Trial

Art and Music

Chamber Choir
Concert Band
Symphonic Band
Symphonic Winds
Wind Ensemble
Guitar Ensemble
Jazz Band
Marching Gators
Men's Chorus
Mixed Chorale
National Art Honor Society
Symphony Orchestra
Photography Club
Tri-M
Women's Chorus

Athletics

Perry Hall has athletic teams for:

Allied Sports
Badminton
Baseball
Basketball
Cheerleading
Cross country
Field Hockey
Football
Golf
Lacrosse
Softball
Soccer
Tennis
Track
Volleyball
Wrestling

State Championships
Girls Cross Country
4A 1993
Boys Cross Country
Class AA 1987
Field Hockey
Class AA 1982
Girls Soccer
4A 2018, 2019
Boys Soccer
4A 2015
Boys Basketball
4A 2017, 2018
Baseball
4A 1990, 1992, 1994
Softball
Class AA 1979

Notable alumni
 Diane Fanning (née Butcher), crime writer
 Chuck Porter, former Major League Baseball player
 James F. Ports Jr., former Member of Maryland House of Delegates
 Alfred W. Redmer Jr., former Member of Maryland House of Delegates, current Maryland State Insurance Commissioner
 Tonja Walker, actress

References

External links

Public high schools in Maryland
Baltimore County Public Schools
Educational institutions established in 1963
Middle States Commission on Secondary Schools
1963 establishments in Maryland